Pieńki Szczepockie  is a village in the administrative district of Gmina Kruszyna, within Częstochowa County, Silesian Voivodeship, in southern Poland.

References

villages in Częstochowa County